Shane O'Rourke (born 3 May 1988) is a former Gaelic footballer who played for the Simonstown Gaels club and for the Meath county team. He is the son of Meath footballing legend Colm O'Rourke and a cousin of former Meath goalkeeper Paddy O'Rourke.

Shane O'Rourke was linked to a move to the Brisbane Lions, Queensland to play in the Australian Football League championship but he is not believed to be interested in the move.

O'Rourke has won a Hogan Cup medal and also captained his side to the All-Ireland Colleges final in 2006; however, they lost the final to Abbey C.B.S. He is currently teaching physical education at St Patrick's Classical School, of which his father Colm is principal.

Honours
Meath Senior Football Championship (2): 2016, 2017
 Meath Footballer of the Year 2016
Leinster Senior Football Championship (1): 2010
Hogan Cup (1): 2004
Leinster Colleges Senior Football Championship (2): 2004, 2006
Leinster Minor Football Championship (1): 2006

References

External links
 Official Meath Website

1988 births
Living people
Bective Gaelic footballers
Irish schoolteachers
Meath inter-county Gaelic footballers